Edward Cilley Roundy (1891 – July 14, 1954) was an American football, basketball, baseball, and ice hockey coach.  He served as the head football coach at St. Lawrence University in 1917, Hampden–Sydney College from 1920 to 1922, and Colby College from 1924 to 1936.  Roundy died on July 14, 1954, at the age of 62, of a heart attack at home in Waterville, Maine.

References

External links
 

1891 births
1954 deaths
Colby Mules baseball coaches
Colby Mules football coaches
Colby Mules men's basketball coaches
Colby Mules men's ice hockey coaches
Hampden–Sydney Tigers athletic directors
Hampden–Sydney Tigers basketball coaches
Hampden–Sydney Tigers football coaches
St. Lawrence Saints football coaches